And Then What? is a 2011 Turkish romantic comedy film, written and directed by Özcan Deniz, starring Deniz Çakır as an unhappily married woman who attempts to restart her long dormant career.

Production
The film was shot on location in Istanbul and Antalya, Turkey.

Synopsis
Married couple Adem and Didem have been married for seven years and their relationship has started to wear out, turning Didem into an unhappy woman as Adem starts showing his love for Didem less and less each day. The only way out for Didem is to return to her career, which she abandoned years ago for the sake of her marriage. In return for her great sacrifice, Didem wants to see the same selflessness from Adem, whom she still loves with all her heart. However her plans change when the knight of a completely different fairytale comes knocking on her door.

Release

See also
 Turkish films of 2011
 2011 in film

References

External links
  for the film (Turkish)
 

2011 films
2010s Turkish-language films
2011 romantic comedy films
Warner Bros. films
Turkish romantic comedy films
Films set in Istanbul
Films set in Ankara